Ebrahimabad (also Romanized as Ebrāhīmābād) is a village in Beyza Rural District, Beyza District, Sepidan County, Fars Province, Iran. At the 2006 census, its population was 356, in 91 families.

References 

Populated places in Sepidan County